Kalvi Kõva (born on 16 November 1974 Rõuge Parish, Võru County) is Estonian politician. He is member of XIV Riigikogu. Since 2001 he belongs to Social Democratic Party.

1999-2007 he was elder of Rõuge Parish.

He has been member of XI, XII and XIII Riigikogu.

Since 2018 he is secretary general of Social Democratic Party.

References

1974 births
Living people
Social Democratic Party (Estonia) politicians
Members of the Riigikogu, 2007–2011 
Members of the Riigikogu, 2011–2015
Members of the Riigikogu, 2015–2019
Members of the Riigikogu, 2019–2023
21st-century Estonian politicians
People from Rõuge Parish
Recipients of the Order of the White Star, 4th Class